The 1970 Sonoma State Cossacks football team represented Sonoma State College—now known as Sonoma State University—as a member of the Far Western Conference (FWC) during the 1970 NCAA College Division football season. This was first year that the school competed in college football as the varsity level. Led by first-year head coach Carl Peterson, Sonoma State compiled an overall record 4–4–1. The Cossacks were ineligible for the FWC title and their games did not count in the conference standings. The team was outscored by their opponents 210 to 157 for the season.

As Sonoma State's campus did not then have a stadium suitable for spectators, home games were played at Bailey Field at Santa Rosa Junior College in Santa Rosa, California.

Schedule

References

Sonoma State
Sonoma State Cossacks football seasons
Sonoma State Cossacks football